My People (Soul People) is an album by American organist Freddie Roach released on Prestige in late 1967, his final one for the label. Roach plays here for the first time the flute and the piano, making use of overdubbing techniques. "Soul people come in all sizes, shapes and descriptions", Roach points out in the liner notes, "and it is to every soul brother that this album is dedicated."

The piece "Prince Street" refers to the road of the same name located in Newark, New Jersey, while "Freddie" is dedicated to Roach's son, Frederick Paul Roach II.

Track listing
All compositions by Freddie Roach, unless otherwise noted
"Prince Street" - 3:49
"Straight Ahead" (Mal Waldron) - 2:55
"Mas que Nada" (Jorge Ben) - 4:18
"Drunk" - 4:37
"My People (Soul People)" - 3:14
"I'm on My Way" - 4:25
"Respectfully Yours" -	2:45
"Freddie" - 4:47

Personnel
Freddie Roach - organ, flute (#2, 6), vocals (#5), piano (#4)
James Anderson - soprano sax
Roland Alexander, Conrad Lester - tenor sax
Harry White - flugelhorn
Kiane Zawadi - euphonium, trombone
Eddie Wright - guitar
Eddie Gladden - drums

References

Prestige Records albums
Freddie Roach (organist) albums
1967 albums
Albums recorded at Van Gelder Studio